USS Enaj (SP-578) was a United States Navy patrol vessel in commission from 1917 to 1918.

Enaj was built as a private steam yacht of the same name by the Herreshoff Manufacturing Company at Bristol, Rhode Island, in 1909. On 11 June 1917, the U.S. Navy acquired her under a free lease from her owner for use as a section patrol vessel during World War I. She was commissioned the same day as USS Enaj (SP-578).

Assigned to the 2nd Naval District in southern New England, Enaj carried out patrols and executed special duty assignments with the Inspection Section at Newport, Rhode Island, for the rest of World War I.

Enaj was returned to her owner on 31 December 1918.

References

SP-578 Enaj at Department of the Navy Naval History and Heritage Command Online Library of Selected Images: U.S. Navy Ships -- Listed by Hull Number "SP" #s and "ID" #s -- World War I Era Patrol Vessels and other Acquired Ships and Craft numbered from SP-500 through SP-599
NavSource Online: Section Patrol Craft Photo Archive: Enaj (SP 578)

Patrol vessels of the United States Navy
World War I patrol vessels of the United States
Ships built in Bristol, Rhode Island
1909 ships
Individual yachts